The 2011 Under 21 Women's Australian Championships was a women's field hockey tournament held in Australia's capital city, Canberra, from 12–23 July.

WA won the gold medal after defeating NSW 1–0 in the final. QLD won the bronze medal by defeating the VIC 1–0 in the third place match.

Teams

 ACT
 NSW
 NT
 QLD
 SA
 TAS
 VIC
 WA

Results

Preliminary round

Fixtures

Classification round

Fifth to eighth place classification

Crossover

Seventh and eighth place

Fifth and sixth place

First to fourth place classification

Semi-finals

Third and fourth place

Final

Awards

Statistics

Final standings

Goalscorers

References

External links

2011
2011 in Australian field hockey
2011 in Australian women's field hockey
Sports competitions in Canberra